The 2022–23 Providence Friars men's basketball team represented Providence College during the 2022–23 NCAA Division I men's basketball season. The team was led by 12th-year head coach Ed Cooley, and played their home games at Amica Mutual Pavilion in Providence, Rhode Island as a member of the Big East Conference. This season also marked the team's last season under Ed Cooley

Previous season
The Friars finished the 2021–22 season 27–6, 14–3 in Big East play to win the school's first regular season championship. The Friars defeated Butler in the quarterfinals of the Big East tournament before losing to Creighton in the semifinals. They received an at-large bid to the NCAA  tournament as the No. 4 seed in the Midwest region. They defeated South Dakota State and Richmond to advance to the Sweet Sixteen. There they lost to No. 1 seed Kansas.

Offseason

Departures

Incoming transfers

Recruiting classes

2022 recruiting class

2023 recruiting class

Roster

Schedule and results

|-
!colspan=12 style=| Exhibition

|-
!colspan=12 style=| Non-conference regular season

|-
!colspan=12 style=| Big East regular season

|-
!colspan=9 style="|Big East tournament

|-
!colspan=12 style=| NCAA tournament

Source

Rankings

References

Providence Friars men's basketball seasons
Providence Friars
Providence Friars men's basketball
Providence Friars men's basketball
Providence